Dmitri Vyacheslavovich Osipov (born 14 February 1996) is a Russian football player. He plays for FC Torpedo Miass.

Club career
He made his debut in the Russian Professional Football League for FC Sibir-2 Novosibirsk on 29 September 2015 in a game against FC Sakhalin Yuzhno-Sakhalinsk.

He made his Russian Premier League debut for FC Tom Tomsk on 3 March 2017 in a game against FC Rostov.

References

External links
 Profile by Russian Professional Football League

1996 births
Sportspeople from Samara, Russia
Living people
Russian footballers
Association football defenders
FC Tom Tomsk players
PFC Krylia Sovetov Samara players
FC Sibir Novosibirsk players
FC Chita players
FC Torpedo Miass players
Russian Premier League players
Russian Second League players